The 1980 Arkansas State Indians football team was an American football team that represented the Arkansas State University as a member of the Southland Conference during the 1980 NCAA Division I-AA football season. In their second season under head coach Larry Lacewell, the Indians compiled an overall record of 2–9 with a mark of 0–5 in conference play, placing last out of six teams in Southland.

Schedule

References

Arkansas State
Arkansas State Red Wolves football seasons
Arkansas State Indians football